The John D'Emilio LGBTQ History Dissertation Award is presented annually by the Organization of American Historians (OAH) to the author of the best dissertation accepted for a doctoral degree the preceding year in U.S. LGBTQ history.

The award was established in 2016 and has been awarded every year since 2017. It is named for John D'Emilio, whom the OAH called "a pioneer" in the field.

Recipients
The award recipients, the institution that accepted the dissertation, and its title have been:

 2017: Ian Baldwin, "Family, Housing, and the Political Geography of Gay Liberation in Los Angeles County, 1960–1986", University of Nevada, Las Vegas
 2018: Chelsea Del Rio, "'That Women Could Matter': Building Lesbian Feminism in California, 1955–1982", University of Michigan
 2019: Scott De Orio, "Punishing Queer Sexuality in the Age of LGBT Rights", University of Michigan
 2020: Caroline Radesky, "Feeling Historical: Same-Sex Desire and Historical Imaginaries, 1880–1920", University of Iowa
 2021: Elisabeth Frances George, "Lesbian and Gay Life in the Queen City and Beyond: Resistance, Space, and Community Mobilization in the Southwest Missouri Ozarks", SUNY Buffalo
 2022: Beans Velocci, "Binary Logic: Race, Expertise, and the Persistence of Uncertainty in American Sex Research", Yale University

References
 

American history awards
Awards established in 2016
Organization of American Historians